Hinnerk Scheper, (born 6 September 1897 in Wulften (Badbergen); district of Bersenbrück/Osnabrück), as 'Gerhard Hermann Heinrich Scheper; died 5 February 1957 in Berlin) was a German colour designer, mural painter, architectural colorist, non-fiction author, photographer, monument conservator, restorer, state curator, and urban planner.

Life 

Gerhard Hermann Heinrich was born on 6 September, 1897 as son of Catherine Düne and stepfather master carpenter Hermann Gerhard Heinrich Scheper. His older brother was Hermann Scheper, who was born on 3 April, 1842.

At the age of 7 Hinnerk was enrolled in the Protestant Volksschule in Wulften in 1904. After finishing school in 1912, he began an apprenticeship as a painter with Gustav Nehmelmann. With the simultaneous attendance of a further education school in nearby Osnabrück, Hinnerk expanded his knowledge in the subjects drawing and mathematics. In 1915, after successful completion of his journeyman's examination, he found his first job in Quakenbrück with painter Rudolf Engel and in 1916 he worked in the post office in Badbergen, as his master received a military service obligation to a shipyard in Bremen. In the preceding period Hinnerk managed to sell two of his paintings he had painted himself and used the money to buy his first camera. He developed the photos in his self built darkroom.

The time at the Bauhaus 
From 1918 to 1919 he attended the School of Arts and Crafts (majoring in photography) in Düsseldorf and Bremen. From 1919 to 1922 he studied at the Bauhaus in Weimar in the preliminary course of Johannes Itten and Paul Klee as well as mural painting with Itten and Oskar Schlemmer. Hinnerk Scheper passed his master examination as a painter. In the same year he married his fellow student Lou Berkenkamp. From 1922 to 1925 Scheper worked as a mural painter and colour designer, also for buildings in Weimar and Münster. From 1925, Scheper headed the workshop for mural painting at the Bauhaus in Dessau, succeeding Wassily Kandinsky, until the final closure of the Bauhaus by the National Socialists in 1933.

The “Bauhaus Wallpaper” 

Under the leadership of director Hannes Meyer, who succeeded Walter Gropius on 1 April 1928, a group was appointed to develop designs for the Bauhaus Wallpaper Collection; they were Hinnerk Scheper, Ludwig Hilberseimer, Josef Albers and Joost Schmidt. Hinnerk organized a design competition for the wallpaper patterns among his students in the mural painting workshop. Through , sister of Emil Rasch, co-owner of the wallpaper factory  in Bramsche, the production of the Bauhaus patterns was stimulated. The collection comprised 14 patterns, each with 5 to 15 colour variations, each with a structured, small-scale design that could be processed free of waste. After initial difficulties, the wallpaper became a complete economic success and through constant modernisation, the patterns also outlasted the Bauhaus closure up to today's Rasch range.

The Time in Moscow 

From 1929 to 1931, Scheper was on leave from the Bauhaus to work in Moscow, the Soviet Union capital to set up and manage a state consulting centre for colour design with associated teaching activities for the entire Soviet Union. Mrs Lou accompanied him to Moscow and supported him during this time. In addition, Scheper taught at the School of Design Vkhutemas. At the same time he created photo series about people and architecture in the Soviet Union. His Russian colleague in the "Advisory Centre for Colour in Architecture and Cityscape" (Russian Maljarstroj) became , a student of Mikhail Matyushin. 1930  followed his teacher and took over the leadership in the planning office Maljarstrojprojekt in 1931, as Hinnerk returned to Germany.

The Time of National Socialism 
Together with his wife Scheper worked for various photo agencies in Berlin until 1932. After 1934 he was engaged in freelance artistic work, colour design and restoration work. In 1934 the National Socialists refused Hinnerk the membership in the "Reichsverband der Deutschen Presse" (Association of the German Press). From 1942 to 1945 Scheper did military service in Germany.

After World War II 

In 1945, the Berlin magistrate appointed him head of the Office for the Preservation of Monuments and Urban Planning and as State Conservator of Berlin. In the same year, he was one of the rescuers of the Neue Wache in Berlin, as was the architect and curator of monuments Selman Selmanagić in 1949.
During the division of Berlin, Scheper protested unsuccessfully against the eviction of the Berlin City Palacees by the Volkspolizei in October 1948. The hopeless struggle against the demolition of the palace, which was being pursued by the East Berlin magistrate, caused him and the director of the Berlin Palace Department,  to move their offices to West Berlin. In 1951, Hinnerk attracted attention as an expert witness in an expert commission consisting of Professor Richard Sedlmaier from Kiel, Professor Günther Grundmann and Dr. jur. Günter Scheefe from Hamburg. The commission unmasked the forgeries in the Marienkirche of Lübeck. After the war, the "Bauhaus Wallpaper Collection" was relaunched in 1950/51, still in the same design of the 1930s. Hinnerk, like in the period up to the beginning of the war, remained responsible for its colour scheme. From 1952/53 the Rasch company modernised the collection and oriented itself towards Scandinavian designs.

Hinnerk Scheper died on May 5, 1957 in Berlin. The couple's grave is in the forest cemetery Zehlendorf.

Family 
On December 22, 1922 he married his wife Lou, née Hermine Luise Berkenkamp in the city church St. Peter and Paul in Weimar.

The following children resulted from the marriage:
 Jan Gisbert (* November 7, 1923)
 Britta (* 28 March 1926; † 14 January 2012)
 Dirk (* August 21, 1938)
His daughter-in-law became the wife of son Dirk, Renate Scheper.

Works 
Highlights in Scheper's work in Dessau were his colour design and the colour coding system in the Bauhaus building/Dessau and the colour design of the masters' houses as well as that of the Dessau Törten settlement. Among his most important colour designs in Moscow was the [[Einküchenhaus#Moscow 1928]-Narkomfin building]] by Ginsburg and Milinis. "The reconstruction of Berlin, in particular the rescue and restoration of historical buildings, churches and palaces, remains closely associated with the name Hinnerk Scheper."
 1926 Design of the exhibition rooms in the galerie  in Dresden, for the exhibition by Paul Klee in June of the year.
 Design planning for a colour coding system in the Weimar Castle Museum
 Colour design for functional areas in the Folkwang Museum, Essen
 1945 Neue Wache in Berlin, rescued by starting restoration against Soviet demolition plans.
 From 1945 reconstruction of Schloss Charlottenburg, especially the built parts of Eosander from Göthe (1669 – 1728)
 1946 Hinnerk Scheper has the equestrian statue of Friedrich Wilhelm I sunk in the Borsighafen Berlin Tegel. The sensational recovery followed in 1948 and, after restoration in 1951, it was repositioned, but no longer in its original place on the Kurfürstenbrücke, but in the Ehrenhof of Charlottenburg Palace. For the Senate in West Berlin, a transfer to the original location in East Berlin was out of the question, since by decision of the state leadership of the German Democratic Republic (GDR) the baroque Berlin Castle, in sight of the bridge, was simply blown up in September 1950
 1949 - 1955 Head of the restoration of the staircase in Schloss Glienicke and of Knobelsdorff wing at Charlottenburg Palace and with restorer 
 1950-56 Reconstruction of the Luisenkirche (Berlin-Charlottenburg)
 1951 Statement against the art forger Lothar Malskat with his forgery in the St. Mary's Church, Lübeck. Sentencing of Malskat on January 25, 1955.
 1952-1957 Restoration of the Johanniskirche (Berlin), under the direction of the architects Otto Bartning and Professor Werry Roth (1885-1958) in the sense of Schinkels
 1954 City curator Hinnerk has the figures of the Siegesallee buried in the park of the Schloss Bellevue under the strictest secrecy to protect them from the Allies and Communists. The Berliners called the Siegesallee their "doll's alley". With the consent of the Federal President of that time] Walter Scheel the figures were not excavated again until 1979 in the course of the action "Save the monuments"
 Commitment to the preservation and careful reconstruction of the baroque Kammergericht's Berlin built (built 1734/1735)

Own literary works - non-fiction 

 Restaurieren und Berufsethos - (Article) Author: Hinnerk Scheper (Source: Deutsche Kunst und Denkmalpflege / hrsg. by d. Vereinigung der Landesdenkmalpfleger in der Bundesrepublik Deutschland. 1955, 109-111 Publisher: 1955).
 The Buildings and Art Monuments of Berlin, Tiergarten District - Author: Hinnerk Scheper Publisher: Berlin : , 1955. (Synagogue architecture. Synagogue architecture. - Germany - Berlin. Synagogues.)
 The buildings and art monuments of Berlin - Author: Hinnerk Scheper; Paul Ortwin Rave - Publisher: Berlin Gebr. Mann
 The Buildings and Art Monuments of Berlin - Im Auftr. d. Senats v. Berlin ed. by Hinnerk Scheper. Writer: Paul Ortwin Rave. From 3:] Im Auftr. d. Senators f. Bau- u. Wohnungswesen published by the Berlin State Conservator [sp.:] Amt. f. Preservation of Monuments.  Author: Hinnerk Scheper Publisher: Berlin Gebr. Mann 1955.
 The buildings and art monuments of Berlin - Author: Hinnerk Scheper; Irmgard Wirth; Berlin (West). Senate. Publisher: Berlin : Mann, 1955 (introduced by Paul Ortwin Rave / commissioned by the Senate Berlin-West.
 Die Bauwerke und Kunstdenkmäler von Berlin - magazine, magazine: Serien Verlag: Berlin Gebr. Mann
 Scheper, Hinnerk, 1897-1957. artist file - Author: Hinnerk Scheper; Ingalls Library, (Manuscript material, Archival materials)
 Ten years of monument preservation in Berlin (article) - Author: Hinnerk Scheper (Source: Deutsche Kunst und Denkmalpflege / ed. by d. Vereinigung der Landesdenkmalpfleger in der Bundesrepublik Deutschland. 1957, 56-60 Publisher: 1957)
 Tafelband - Author: Paul Ortwin Rave; Hinnerk Scheper; Irmgard Wirth Verlag: Berlin : Gebr. Mann Verlag, 1961. (Charlottenburg, T. 2.; City and District of Charlottenburg / Writings and Insert: Paul Ortwin Rave. Edited by Irmgard Wirth, Tafelbd.; Buildings and Art Monuments of Berlin / ed. by the Senator for Urban Development and Environmental Protection, Landeskonservator, 2nd ed.)
 The Buildings and Monuments of Art of Berlin. 2], Charlottenburg - Author: Hinnerk Scheper; Berlin (West). Office for preservation of monuments.
 The buildings and art monuments of Berlin. [2] City and district of Charlottenburg : Tafelbd. - Author: Hinnerk Scheper Publisher: Berlin Mann 1961
 Text volume - Author: ; Paul Ortwin Rave; Hinnerk Scheper Verlag: Berlin : Gebr. Mann Verlag, 1970 (Charlottenburg, T. 1.; Schloß Charlottenburg / edited by Margarete Kühn, text ibid.; Bauwerke und Kunstdenkmäler von Berlin / ed. by the Senator für Stadtentwicklung und Umweltschutz, Landeskonservator, 2nd ed.)
 The Buildings and Monuments of Art of Berlin. 3], District Kreuzberg - Author: Hinnerk Scheper; Berlin (West). Office for Monument Preservation. Publisher: Berlin Mann
 The buildings and art monuments of Berlin. 4] Kreuzberg District : Maps and Plans - Author: Hinnerk Scheper Publisher: Berlin Mann 1980
 The Kaiser Wilhelm Memorial Church : Origin and Significance - Author: Vera Frowein-Ziroff; Paul Ortwin Rave; Hinnerk Scheper Verlag: Berlin : Gebr. Mann Verlag, 1982 (Buildings and Art Monuments of Berlin / ed. by the Senator for Urban Development and Environmental Protection, State Conservator, Beih. 9.)
 Photo: Hinnerk Scheper : a Bauhäusler as photo journalist in Dessau (exhibition catalogue) - Author: Renate Scheper; Hinnerk Scheper Verlag: Dessau: Anhaltische Verl.-Ges., 1991.(Contributions to the city history, 13th ; Scheper, Hinnerk. Photography. Dessau 1991)
 Maps and plans - author: Manfred Hecker; Paul Ortwin Rave; Hinnerk Scheper (handwritten material, archival materials) Kreuzberg district / edited by Manfred Hecker, 4,1; Buildings and art monuments of Berlin / edited by the Senator for Urban Development and Environmental Protection, State Curator, 4th ed.)
 Hinnerk Scheper : colour designer, photographer, monument conservator influenced by the Bauhaus - Author: Hinnerk Scheper; Renate Scheper; Förderverein Meisterhäuser Dessau Verlag: Bramsche : Rasch, 2007 (Catalogue book for the exhibition in the Muche Masters' House in Dessau from 5 October to 25 November 2007, organised by the Förderverein Meisterhäuser Dessau e.V. with the support of the city of Dessau-Rosslau ; from 7 March to 18 May 2008, the exhibition will also be shown by the Förderkreis der Bauhaus-Universität Weimar e.V. in the Haus am Horn in Weimar)

Literature 
 Renate Scheper: "Photo: Hinnerk Scheper. A Bauhäusler as a photo journalist in Dessau." Anhaltische Verlags-Gesellschaft, Dessau 1991, .
 Renate Scheper (Ed.): Hinnerk Scheper: Colour designer, photographer, monument conservator influenced by the Bauhaus. Rasch, Bramsche 2007, .

Itemized statements (in German)

External links 
 
 Hinnerk Scheper 1920–1922 Bauhaus student / 1925–1933 Bauhaus young master
 Experimental Colour Plan for the Facade of the Bauhaus Building, Dessau Hinnerk Scheper
 Joint work Hinnerk and Lou Scheper
 Bauhaus wallpapers
 The Bauhaus Wall Painting Workshop: Mural Painting to Wallpapering, Art to Product Wallpapering, Art to Product Morgan Ridler Graduate Center, City University of New York

20th-century photographers
20th-century German artists
Historical preservationists
Conservator-restorers
Academic staff of the Bauhaus
Artists from Osnabrück
Bauhaus alumni
1897 births
1957 deaths
Burials at the Waldfriedhof Zehlendorf